Prisoner (known internationally as Prisoner: Cell Block H and Caged Women) is an Australian soap opera created by Reg Watson, and was produced by the Reg Grundy Organisation for Network Ten. The series was set primarily within the fictional Wentworth Detention Centre, and filmed at Network Ten Studios Melbourne, located in the suburb of Nunawading.

The airdates listed below are from ATV0/10 Australia, in Melbourne, the series' regional network.

Series overview

Episodes

Season 1 (1979)

Season 2 (1980)

Season 3 (1981)

Season 4 (1982)

Season 5 (1983)
In Brisbane, following Val Lehman's resignation, TVQ-0 cancelled the series after episode 400 was aired

Season 6 (1984)

Season 7 (1985)

Season 8 (1986)

External links

 Fan site with detailed episode guides www.wwwentworth.co.uk

Lists of Australian drama television series episodes
Lists of LGBT-related television series episodes